The 1986–87 Kansas State Wildcats men's basketball team represented Kansas State University as a member of the Big 8 Conference during the 1986-87 NCAA Division I men's basketball season. The head coach was Lon Kruger who was in his first of four years at the helm of his alma mater. The team played its home games in Ahearn Field House in Manhattan, Kansas. The Wildcats finished 4th in the Big 8 regular season standings and fell to conference champion Missouri in the semifinal round of the Big 8 Tournament. K-State received an at-large bid to the NCAA tournament as No. 9 seed in the West region. After an opening round win over Georgia in overtime, the Wildcats were beaten by eventual Final Four participant and No. 1 ranked UNLV in the round of 32.

Roster

Schedule

|-
!colspan=6 style=| Regular Season

|-
!colspan=6 style=| Big 8 Tournament

|-
!colspan=6 style=| NCAA Tournament

Source

Rankings

References

Kansas State
Kansas State
Kansas State Wildcats men's basketball seasons
1986 in sports in Kansas
1987 in sports in Kansas